Zahir bin Hassan is a Malaysian politician. He served as a Member of Parliament of Wangsa Maju since December 2022, he is a member of the People's Justice Party (PKR), a component party of Pakatan Harapan (PH).

He has been appointed as the Managing Secretary of the People's Justice Party (PKR) for the 2022-2025 session.

Election result

References

Members of the 15th Malaysian Parliament
Living people
People's Justice Party (Malaysia) politicians
Year of birth missing (living people)